John Stork (died c. 1466), of Trent, Somerset, was an English politician and lawyer.

Stork married Alice, the widow of John Petyr. They had one son and she died after Stork, in 1474.

He was a Member (MP) of the Parliament of England for Dorchester in 1420 and May 1421.

References

Year of birth missing
1466 deaths
English MPs 1420
Politicians from Somerset
Members of the Parliament of England for Dorchester
English MPs May 1421